Anbil Mahesh Poyyamozhi  (born 2 December 1977 as "Nallamuththu Poyyamozhi") is an Indian politician serving as the Minister for School Education in Tamil Nadu and District secretary for Trichy district-South (Trichy east, Thiruverumbur & Manapparai constituencies) of Dravida Munnetra Kazhagam party. He was the Member of Legislative Assembly from 2016–2021. He served as the State Secretary of DMK Youth Wing from 2014–2019.

Political career 
He started his political life as a party worker in the year 2000. He actively took part in various party activities and was appointed the Youth Wing Secretary in 2014. He was elected as a Member of Tamil Nadu Legislative Assembly from Thiruverumbur constituency in 2016.
He was again elected as MLA in May 2021 from the Thiruverumbur constituency consecutively and appointed the School Education Minister of Tamil Nadu.

References

one of the best politician in Tamil Nadu

1983 births
Living people
Dravida Munnetra Kazhagam politicians
Tamil Nadu MLAs 2016–2021
People from Tiruchirappalli district
Tamil Nadu MLAs 2021–2026